Howrey is a surname. People with this surname include:

E. Philip Howrey (1937–2011), American economist
Edward F. Howrey (1903–1996), Chair of the Federal Trade Commission, and founder of the law firm, Howrey
Meg Howrey, half of the writing duo under the pseudonym Magnus Flyte

See also
Howry, a surname